Super President is an American animated cartoon that aired Saturday mornings on NBC from September 16, 1967 to December 28, 1968. The series was produced by the DePatie–Freleng animation company.

In the show, the President of the United States has extraordinary superpowers, including increased strength and the ability to change his molecular composition, and uses them to protect the Free World, as well as his hapless Vice President. The show was relentlessly criticized for its bad taste and low quality, and was cancelled after thirty episodes, midway through its second season.

O Sombra
There was a cartoon that aired on this show called "O Sombra - The Spy Shadow". It was also a superhero cartoon. This cartoon is unavailable and there are only a few recordings available that showed the entire cartoon. It was released in 1967.

Plot
The President of the United States, former Astronaut James Norcross (voiced by Paul Frees) is given superpowers as the result of a cosmic storm during a space mission. The future President gains increased strength and the Metamorpho-like ability to change his molecular composition at will to any form required (like granite, steel, ozone, water and even electricity). A hidden panel in the Oval Office allows him access to his secret base, a hidden cave beneath the "Presidential Mansion" (a somewhat modified White House). Super President travels either by using a futuristic automobile/aircraft/submarine called the Omnicar, or by using jets built into his belt.

Despite the fact that the character's name is "Super President", for some reason only Norcross' chubby, pipe-smoking advisor Jerry Sales knows that the leader of the Free World is also a red and white-costumed superhero in his off-hours.

A total of thirty episodes of Super President were produced. Two episodes appeared in each show. Each episode also included an episode of Spy Shadow starring secret agent Richard Vance (voiced by Ted Cassidy) who had learned in Tibet how to command his shadow (also voiced by Ted Cassidy) to act independently of himself, an ability he put to good use as an Interspy operative battling a variety of villains, including the evil forces of S.P.I.D.E.R. ("Society for Plunder, International Disorder, Espionage and Racketeering"). Spy Shadow had the power to slip through small openings, hide himself in another person's shadow, and was invulnerable to harm thanks to his insubstantial nature, but his fists remained decidedly solid. Spy Shadow's only weakness is the inability to appear in total darkness for "there can be no shadow without light".

Reception
Super President came under fire from critics and TV watchdog groups, including Action for Children's Television, for its depiction of a national leader who was an invincible superhuman (especially since it debuted less than four years after John Kennedy's death). The National Association of Broadcasters said: "An all-time low in bad taste, with the President of the United States in a Superman role. NBC was responsible for this direct ideological approach to totalitarianism. We fear that there may be other broadcasters who are irresponsible enough to keep it in circulation".

In The Encyclopedia of American Animated Television Shows, David Perlmutter says that the show is "perhaps the worst animated program in the late 1960s (its producers admitted it themselves)" and calls the superhero president "arguably the most implausible superhero narrative idea ever invented".

Episodes
 The Great Vegetable Disintegrator
 The Billion Dollar Bomber
 The Electronic Spy
 Day of the Locusts
 The Case of the Destroyer Satellite
 King of the Sea
 The U.F.O. Mystery
 No Time Passes
 Man of Steel
 The Earth Robber
 Monster of the Atoll
 Return of the Vikings
 The Cosmic Gladiators
 The Condor's Eye
 The President and the Pirate
 Interplanetary Menace
 Red Ray Raider
 The Treachery of Jerry Sales
 Rangled Terrors
 Dound and Doom
 Spears from Space
 Toys of Death
 Birds of Terror
 The Menace of the Moles
 The Chameleon
 The Gravity Destroyer
 Ice Invader
 Electronic Giant
 Time Crimes
 A Million Years of Menace

Cast
 Daws Butler -
 Ted Cassidy - Richard Vance, Spy Shadow
 June Foray -
 Paul Frees - Super President/James Norcross, Narrator
 Shepard Menken -
 Don Messick -

References

Further reading
 Kevin Scott Collier. The Animated Administration of James Norcross, a.k.a. Super President. CreateSpace Independent Publishing Platform, 2017.

External links
 
 
 Super President at Don Markstein's Toonopedia. Archived from the original on January 1, 2018.
 Review by The Bad Movie Report

NBC original programming
American children's animated adventure television series
American children's animated superhero television series
1967 American television series debuts
1968 American television series endings
Television series by DePatie–Freleng Enterprises
Fictional presidents of the United States
1960s American animated television series
Television series by United Artists Television
Television series about presidents of the United States